Thomas Halliday (born 28 April 1940) is a Scottish former professional footballer, who played for Dumbarton, Greenock Morton, Stranraer  and Alloa Athletic in the Scottish Football League and Cardiff City in the Football League.

Career
Halliday joined Dumbarton in March 1963 and made a goalscoring debut for the club in a 3–1 victory over East Stirlingshire. He scored 21 goals in 28 league appearances for Dumbarton, leading Cardiff City manager George Swindin to pay £5,000 to sign him in October 1963. He made his debut for the club in a 1–1 draw with South Wales rivals Swansea Town and made sixteen league appearances, scoring twice. However, he was displaced in the first team by Derek Tapscott and subsequently returned to Dumbarton.

References

1940 births
Living people
Scottish footballers
Footballers from North Ayrshire
Association football forwards
Scottish Football League players
English Football League players
Largs Thistle F.C. players
Dumbarton F.C. players
Cardiff City F.C. players
Greenock Morton F.C. players
Stranraer F.C. players
Alloa Athletic F.C. players
People from Ardrossan